Édgar Iván Solís Castillón (born 5 March 1987) is a Mexican professional footballer who plays as a left-back.

Club career
He made his debut on August 28, 2005, against Santos Laguna. A game which resulted in a 3–0 victory for Santos over Chivas. He has scored 3 goals in his whole career with Chivas. He has scored one international goal against San Jose from Bolivia in the Copa Santander Libertadores which ended in a 2–0 victory. For the 2010–11 season, Solís was sent out on loan at Atlante F.C. He was used for most of the season, but didn't really make an impact with the team. In July 2011, he returned from his loan. He did not make his return debut for the team because of an injury. In June 2012, he was loaned to Monterrey for the season. He returned to Chivas on May 28, 2013.

Honours
Guadalajara
Primera División de México: Apertura 2006

Monterrey
CONCACAF Champions League: 2012–13

References

External links
 
 
 Édgar Solís at La Preferente

1987 births
Living people
C.D. Guadalajara footballers
Querétaro F.C. footballers
Atlante F.C. footballers
Tecos F.C. footballers
C.F. Monterrey players
Tigres UANL footballers
C.S. Herediano footballers
Potros UAEM footballers
Real Burgos CF footballers
Real Estelí F.C. players
Liga MX players
Ascenso MX players
Liga FPD players
Footballers from Jalisco
People from Tepatitlán
Mexican footballers
Mexican expatriate footballers
Association football midfielders
Mexican expatriate sportspeople in Costa Rica
Mexican expatriate sportspeople in Spain
Mexican expatriate sportspeople in Nicaragua
Mexican expatriate sportspeople in El Salvador
Expatriate footballers in Costa Rica
Expatriate footballers in Spain
Expatriate footballers in Nicaragua
Expatriate footballers in El Salvador
Liga de Balompié Mexicano players